Pëllumbas may refer to:

 Pëllumbas, Berat
 Pëllumbas, Tirana
 Pëllumbas cave, near Pëllumbas, Tirana